Clanis surigaoensis is a species of moth of the  family Sphingidae. It is known from the Philippines.

The wingspan is about 78 mm. It is very similar to Clanis titan but the forewing apex is more attenuated and slightly falcate. There is a large cinnamon-coloured costal patch on forewing upperside.

References

Clanis
Moths described in 1928